hitchBOT was a Canadian hitchhiking robot created by professors David Harris Smith of McMaster University and Frauke Zeller of Ryerson University in 2013. It gained international attention for successfully hitchhiking across Canada, Germany and the Netherlands, but in 2015 its attempt to hitchhike across the United States ended when it was stripped and decapitated in Philadelphia, Pennsylvania.

Description 

Smith, who had hitchhiked across Canada 3 times, and Zeller had "designed the robot to learn about how people interact with technology and ask the question, 'Can robots trust human beings?'" The robot was not able to walkit completed its "hitchhiking" journeys by "asking" to be carried by those who picked it up. The robot was able to carry on basic conversation and talk about facts, and was designed to be a robotic traveling companion while in the vehicle of the driver who picked it up. As a social experiment, it was also given social media accounts on Twitter, Facebook and Instagram. 

The robot had a cylindrical body composed mainly of a plastic bucket, with two flexible "arms" and two flexible "legs" attached to the torso. The top section of the body was transparent, containing a screen which displayed eyes and a mouth, making the robot approximately humanoid in external appearance. It was small and had a look the team described as "yard-sale chic", to evoke trust and empathy, and had a child's car seat base to be easily and safely transportable. It was powered either by solar power or by automobile cigarette lighters. It had a GPS device and a 3G connection, which allowed researchers to track its location. It was equipped with a camera, which took photographs periodically to document its journeys.

Travels 
The robot's "hitchhiking" was reported by the press in many countries. From July 27, 2014 to August 21, 2014, it hitchhiked across Canada from the Institute for Applied Creativity at NSCAD University Halifax, Nova Scotia, to Victoria, British Columbia. At a First Nations powwow, it was given a name translating as "Iron Woman". The robot was so popular that its GPS had to be disabled sometimes to prevent crowds bothering those who took it into their homes. 

A second hitchBOT machine was made, and in February 2015 it hitchhiked around Germany for 10 days. For 3 weeks in June 2015, it hitched around the Netherlands. HitchBOT then attempted to cross the United States from Boston to San Francisco starting on July 17, 2015. After 2 weeks, on August 1, 2015 however, a photo was tweeted, showing that the robot had been stripped and decapitated in Philadelphia. The head was never found. On August 3, 2015 Adam Gabbatt reported on the Guardian website about hitchBOT's destruction. Frauke Zeller, co-creator of hitchBOT, was quoted saying: "We can see on all our data that the tablet and battery and everything shut off at the same time so it must have been when they vandalised the bot." The article also states:
She said Hitchbot’s body had been found by some good samaritans who had located the roving robot through a regularly updated map on its website. "They sent us images and it’s really beyond repair. There’s not a single wire inside and all the things are broken."

Legacy 
hitchBOT's ordeal highlighted the issues of autonomous technology, the ethics of robot treatment, and the anthropomorphism of animate-like devices. The first hitchBOT is now a permanent exhibit at the Canada Science and Technology Museum. 

Smith and Zeller recreated their invention as hitchBOT 2.0 in 2019. The robot was sent to Paris, France, where it was touring about and appearing in a play, Killing Robots, written by Linda Blanchet.

The tour had to be put on hold indefinitely, however, due to COVID-19.

Similar robots 
Zeller has also created an art critic robot called kulturBOT.
A similar hitch-hiking robot, known as TweenBOT, travelled in the later 2000s. Its purpose was also to study interaction of humans with it.

References

External links 

 

2013 robots
Hitchhiking
Humanoid robots
Robots of Canada
Vandalized works of art in Pennsylvania
2015 disestablishments in Pennsylvania